Walter Jess (born April 13, 1942) was a Canadian politician who served in the Legislative Assembly of Saskatchewan from 1991 to 1999, as a NDP member for the constituency of Redberry.

References

Saskatchewan New Democratic Party MLAs
1942 births
Living people
20th-century Canadian politicians
21st-century Canadian politicians